Attwater's prairie chicken (Tympanuchus cupido attwateri) is a highly endangered subspecies of the greater prairie chicken that is native to coastal Texas and formerly Louisiana in the United States.

Description
Attwater's prairie chicken measures 17–18 in (43-45.5 cm) and weighs roughly 1.5 to 2.0 lb (0.7 to 0.9 kg). It has a 28-in (70-cm) wingspan. These grouse have strong vertical bars of dark brown and buff-white pattern over the mantle, flanks, and underparts. The species exhibits sexual dimorphism, with the males having elongated feathers, called pinnae, erected to form what looks like ear-like structures. The male also has as a bright orange or golden air sac on either side of his neck, which he inflates during mating displays. They have a lifespan of 2-5 years.

Habitat and range
T. c. attwateri is endemic to the Western Gulf coastal grasslands. This covered an area of 6 million acres (24,000 km²). Today, populations exist in the wild at two locations: the Attwater Prairie Chicken National Wildlife Refuge near Eagle Lake, Texas, and on private lands in Goliad County.

Reproduction
The mating display can be seen January through mid-May, peaking in mid-March, when the birds gather in small groups on short grass, bare ground, or hilly areas to choose a mate. This area is called a lek or "booming ground." In these areas, the females watch the males and choose their mate. The male emits a booming, "woo-woo" sound from his neck sack, causing it to inflate, and struts around to attract a female. Some of the traditional dances of the North American Plains Indians are based on this booming display.

In late spring, the hens lay 10 to 14 eggs in nests on the ground, hidden in tall grass. The eggs hatch about 26 days later. Only about 3 in 10 eggs hatch and the others are lost to predators. The chicks stay with the hen for about six weeks.

Diet and predation
This species has a diverse diet, eating grass shoots, petals of flowers, seeds, and insects such as grasshoppers. Their predators include hawks, owls, coyotes, raccoons, skunks, opossums, and snakes. Chicks are susceptible to flooding.

Conservation
In 1900, up to 1,000,000 Attwater's prairie chickens inhabited the coastal grasslands. Loss of habitat is believed to be the prime reason for their decline. One of the major factors contributing to the habitat loss was the widespread planting, beginning in the early 1900s, of Chinese tallow trees (Triadica sebifera) to establish a soapmaking industry. Since that time, T. sebifera has proven to be an aggressive invader of the coastal grasslands, where it displaces the diverse native plant assemblage that was dominated by prairie grasses and forbs with dense, near-monospecific stands that significantly alter biotic and abiotic ecosystem processes. Urbanization further contributes to habitat loss. As a result of these changes over the last 100 years, the entire grassland ecosystem where Attwater's prairie chicken once thrived exists in small, scattered patches whose continued existence is threatened. Where once grazing plains bison and periodic wildfires due to lightning reduced brush, the birds now have difficulty making their way through thick undergrowth. Other, less-apparent changes in the ecosystem possibly have had an effect, as well.

A 1937 study recorded about 8,700 Attwater's prairie chickens remaining in four Texas counties. Attwater's prairie chicken has been on the endangered species list since March 1967 when an estimated 1,070 birds were left in the wild. By 2003,  fewer than 50 birds remained in the wild.

In 1999, Nature Conservancy decided to permit new drilling close to primary breeding grounds on Texas land owned by the Conservancy. This has harmed the grouse and their habitat, according to the Wildlife Society. Drilling in sensitive areas is destructive and opposed by environmentalists. The number of Attwater's prairie chickens nesting on the land owned by the Conservancy fell from 36 in 1998 to 16 in 2003. Analysis by Nature Conservancy's Texas science director said that that new oil drilling project subjected the grouse to a "higher probability of death." In 2007, Nature Conservancy issued new permits to drill a new oil well on protected land. Attwater's
prairie chickens have since disappeared from the site.

In 2014, an estimated 260 birds remained, with about 100 living in the wild. Captive-breeding programs are underway at places such as Fossil Rim Wildlife Center, Abilene Zoo, and Caldwell Zoo (Tyler, TX). Through a partnership with the Houston Zoo, a captive-breeding flock is residing on the grounds of the NASA Lyndon B. Johnson Space Center near Clear Lake.

In 2016, the population declined to 42 birds following heavy spring floods, which wiped out an entire generation of eggs. Hurricane Harvey in 2017 was even more disastrous, likely killing at least 32 birds, with only five females found during the post-hurricane survey of the area. However, in the spring of 2018, the estimated wild population was 12. As of February 2019, with the Houston Zoo having released many individuals the previous year, the wild population was around 200. Since then, the wild population has decreased again. A count done later that year indicated only 108 birds remaining and a report from February 2021 stated fewer than 100.

See also
Heath hen
Henry Philemon Attwater

References

External links
 Fight to save a prairie chicken The New York Times, 2015
 Attwater Prairie Chicken National Wildlife Refuge
 Texas Parks and Wildlife on the Attwater's Prairie Chicken
 National Geographic Article
 Fossil Rim Wildlife Center
 Handbook of Texas Online
 Houston Zoo

Tympanuchus
Birds described in 1893
Endangered fauna of the United States
Endemic birds of the Plains-Midwest (United States)
ESA endangered species
Species endangered by invasive species
Taxa named by Charles Bendire